Lucius Caecilius Metellus was tribune of the plebs in 49 BC, when he vetoed Julius Caesar's raiding of the Roman state treasury during Caesar's Civil War. Plutarch claims that Metellus' life was threatened when he interposed his veto.

References 

1st-century BC Romans
Tribunes of the plebs
Marcus